Laurence Flaherty (26 May 1882 – 5 January 1979) was an Irish sportsperson.  He played hurling with his local club Blackrock and was a member of the Cork senior inter-county team from 1903 until 1915.  Flaherty won an All-Ireland winners' medal and two Munster winners' medals with Cork.  At the time of his death he was the oldest surviving All-Ireland medal winner.

References

1882 births
1979 deaths
Blackrock National Hurling Club hurlers
Cork inter-county hurlers
All-Ireland Senior Hurling Championship winners